Brigadier General Julian Stachiewicz (1890-1934) was a Polish Army officer and a historian and writer.

Life
Julian Stachiewicz was the brother of General Wacław Stachiewicz.

Before World War I he joined the Riflemen's Association. In 1914-21 he fought in the Polish Legions, the Polish Military Organization, the Greater Poland Uprising, the Polish-Ukrainian War, and the Polish-Soviet War. He briefly commanded the 13th Infantry Division and in 1923 became head of the Military Bureau of History (Wojskowe Biuro Historyczne), being promoted a year later to brigadier general.

In 1928 he created the Military Historical Review (Wojskowy Przegląd Historyczny), a journal that is published to this day. He was involved with Polish Radio and was a member of academic societies such as the Polish Academy of Learning.

He was awarded the Virtuti Militari (V class) (1921), the Polonia Restituta (IV and III class), the Cross of Independence with Swords, and four times the Cross of Valour.

See also
List of Poles

1890 births
1934 deaths
Military personnel from Lviv
Polish Austro-Hungarians
Polish Military Organisation members
Polish legionnaires (World War I)
Polish people of the Polish–Ukrainian War
Polish people of the Polish–Soviet War
20th-century Polish historians
Polish male non-fiction writers
Recipients of the Silver Cross of the Virtuti Militari
Recipients of the Cross of Independence with Swords
Commanders of the Order of Polonia Restituta
Recipients of the Cross of Valour (Poland)
20th-century Polish male writers